Jana Dobešová (born 6 August 1968) is a Czech table tennis player. She competed in the women's singles event at the 1996 Summer Olympics.

References

1968 births
Living people
Czech female table tennis players
Olympic table tennis players of the Czech Republic
Table tennis players at the 1996 Summer Olympics
Sportspeople from Přerov